Dendrophagus is a genus of beetles in the family Silvanidae, containing the following species:

 Dendrophagus capito Reitter
 Dendrophagus crenatus Paykull, 1799
 Dendrophagus cygnaei Mannerheim
 Dendrophagus longicornis Reitter

References

Silvanidae genera